Roger Watson (born 20 November 1955) is a British academic. He is Academic Dean in the School of Nursing, Southwest Medical University, China and until 2022 was the Professor of Nursing at the University of Hull. He is the editor-in-chief of Nurse Education in Practice and an Editorial Board Member of the WikiJournal of Medicine. Watson was the Founding Chair of the Lancet Commission on Nursing, and a founding member of the Global Advisory Group for the Future of Nursing. 
Watson was elected Vice President of the National Conference of University Professors in 2020 and became President in 2022 until 2024.

Education
Watson is a Registered Nurse (St George's Hospital London), holds a BSc in biological sciences from the University of Edinburgh, and a PhD in biochemistry from the University of Sheffield.

Professional life
Watson's clinical area is gerontological nursing with a special interest in mealtime and nutritional difficulties of older people with dementia. His research into the alleviation of mealtime difficulty in people with dementia led to the development of the "Edinburgh Feeding Evaluation in Dementia Scale". Watson is a proponent of the application of Mokken scaling in nursing research and has also contributed to the understanding of the general application of Mokken scaling and the influence of sample size on Mokken scaling parameters.

Watson has visiting positions in Slovenia, Australia, Hong Kong, Ireland and Italy. He served as a member of the sub-panel for Nursing and Midwifery in the UK Research Assessment Exercise in 2008, and in 2014 on the sub-panel for Dentistry, Allied Health Professions, Nursing and Pharmacy in the UK Research Excellence Framework.

Previously, he was the editor-in-chief of the Journal of Clinical Nursing, the Journal of Advanced Nursing and the editor of Nursing Open. Watson is a frequent contributor to Times Higher Education, The Conversation, The Salisbury Review, The European Conservative and The Daily Sceptic.

Awards and recognition
Watson is a fellow of the Royal College of Nursing (2009), the American Academy of Nursing (2007), the Royal College of Physicians of Edinburgh (2014), a Fellow of the Higher Education Academy (2007), a Fellow of the Royal College of Surgeons in Ireland Faculty of Nursing and Midwifery ad eundem (2009) and the National Conference of University Professors (2018). Watson is a Member of the Academia Europaea (2019). Watson was formerly a Fellow of the Royal Society of Biology (2001-2019; formerly the Institute of Biology), and a Fellow of the Royal Society of Arts (2001-2019). In 2021 Watson was awarded the honorary degree of Doctor Honoris Causa by the University of Maribor, Slovenia.

Watson delivered the Winifred Raphael Memorial Lecture in 2001. In 2017 Watson was inducted into the Sigma Theta Tau International Nurse Researcher Hall of Fame. That year, Watson also delivered the annual Elsie Stephenson Memorial Lecture at The University of Edinburgh. In 2022 he was awarded the Margaret Comerford Freda award for Editorial Leadership in Nursing Publication by the International Academy of Nursing Editors.

Following military service as a Captain Royal Army Medical Corps(v) in the First Gulf War with 205 Scottish General Hospital RAMC(v) (now 205 Field Hospital) Watson was awarded the Gulf Medal, the Kuwait Liberation Medal (Saudi Arabia) and the Kuwait Liberation Medal (Kuwait).

Personal life

Born to Margaret McCabe and William Morrison Watson Watson is a former pupil of Banchory Academy. Watson is a haiku poet and a member of the British Haiku Society and former member of the Haiku Society of America with entries in the Living Haiku Anthology, the Living Senryu Anthology and The Haiku Foundations Haiku Registry. In 2018, 2019 and 2020, he was selected as one of the European Top 100 most creative haiku authors. A Roman Catholic, he is married to Deborah Watson (née Yould) and they have eight children and nine grandchildren

Bibliography
Watson has over 500 publications listed on Web of Science that have been cited more than 5500 times, giving him an h-index of 40. His three most-cited articles are:

References

External links

Entry on ORCID

Living people
1955 births
Academics of the University of Hull
British nurses
Scottish nurses
Nursing researchers
Alumni of the University of Edinburgh
Alumni of the University of Sheffield
Alumni of St George's, University of London
Fellows of the American Academy of Nursing
Fellows of the Royal College of Nursing
Fellows of the Royal Society of Biology
Fellows of the Royal College of Physicians of Edinburgh
People from Aberdeen
English-language haiku poets
People educated at Banchory Academy
Scottish scholars and academics
Scottish biologists
20th-century Scottish educators
21st-century Scottish educators
Members of Academia Europaea